"Make It Last Forever" is a 1988 single by Keith Sweat and Jacci McGhee.  The song was written and produced by Keith Sweat and Teddy Riley.  Taken as the second single and the title track from Sweat's debut album, the single peaked at #59 on the Billboard Hot 100 and was a hit on the Hot Black Singles chart, where it peaked at #2.

Charts

References

1980s ballads
1987 songs
1988 singles
Elektra Records singles
Keith Sweat songs
New jack swing songs
Song recordings produced by Teddy Riley
Songs written by Keith Sweat
Songs written by Teddy Riley
Male–female vocal duets